The 2019 BNP Paribas Sopot Open is a professional tennis tournament played on clay courts. It will be the 2nd edition of the tournament which is part of the 2019 ATP Challenger Tour. It will take place in Sopot, Poland between 29 July and 4 August 2019.

Singles main-draw entrants

Seeds 

 1 Rankings are as of 22 July 2019.

Other entrants 
The following players received wildcards into the singles main draw:
  Michał Dembek
  Daniel Michalski
  Michał Przysiężny
  Tommy Robredo
  Kacper Żuk

The following player received entry into the singles main draw as a special exempt:
  Mikael Ymer

The following player received entry into the singles main draw using a protected ranking:
  Aleksandre Metreveli

The following players received entry into the singles main draw using their ITF World Tennis Ranking:
  Javier Barranco Cosano
  Riccardo Bonadio
  Ivan Nedelko
  Christopher O'Connell
  Evgenii Tiurnev

The following players received entry from the qualifying draw:
  Paweł Ciaś
  Alexander Zhurbin

Champions

Singles

  Stefano Travaglia def.  Filip Horanský 6–4, 2–6, 6–2.

Doubles

  Andre Begemann /  Florin Mergea def.  Karol Drzewiecki /  Mateusz Kowalczyk 6–1, 3–6, [10–8].

References

External links
 Official website
 BNP Paribas Sopot Open at ATP

2019 ATP Challenger Tour
2019 in Polish tennis
July 2019 sports events in Poland
August 2019 sports events in Poland